Elaine Farrell Wynn ( Pascal; born April 28, 1942) is an American billionaire businesswoman, philanthropist and art collector. She co-founded Mirage Resorts and Wynn Resorts with her former husband, Steve Wynn. She has supported education causes, the performing arts and the visual arts.

Early life
Wynn was born to a middle-class Jewish family on April 28, 1942, in New York City. She graduated from George Washington University, where she received a bachelor of arts degree in Political Science in 1964.

Business career
Wynn co-founded the Mirage Resorts with her former husband in 1976. They also co-founded Wynn Resorts in 2000. She served on its board of directors. She played a pivotal role in the resurgence and expansion of the Las Vegas Strip with her former husband. In 2015, she nominated herself to the board, but she was not confirmed.

Wynn is the company's largest shareholder, with a 9% stake valued in May 2018 at nearly $2 billion.  In 2018, after revelations of Steve Wynn's reported sexual harassment of multiple Wynn employees, and payments to cover up those allegations that were kept secret from the board of directors, he sold his 12% share of the company and agreed to return voting rights to Elaine Wynn (which she had signed away during their 2010 divorce agreement).

In June 2018, Wynn successfully led a shareholder proxy campaign to remove John Hagenbuch from the board, due to his conflict of interest created by ties to the company's former CEO.

Philanthropy and art collection
Wynn serves on the board of trustees of the Elaine P. Wynn & Family Foundation. She served as the chair of the UNLV Foundation, a fundraising organization for the University of Nevada, Las Vegas. She also served on the executive board of the Consortium for Policy Research in Education.

She serves on the national board of directors of Communities In Schools, a non-profit organization which supports financially disadvantaged schoolchildren. She was appointed to Nevada's Blue Ribbon Education Reform Task Force in 2011, and on Nevada's State Board of Education in 2013 and 2015. She was appointed to the board of trustees of the Kennedy Center for the Performing Arts by President Barack Obama in 2011. She serves as the co-chair of the Los Angeles County Museum of Art (LACMA).

Wynn is an avid art collector. In 2013, she acquired Francis Bacon's Three Studies of Lucian Freud for a US$142.4 million, and loaned it to the Portland Art Museum.

Personal life
Wynn married businessman Steve Wynn in 1963. They divorced in 1986, remarried in 1991, and divorced again in 2010. Wynn resides in the couple's mansion inside Southern Highlands Golf Club.

References

1942 births
Living people
American art collectors
American billionaires
American company founders
American women company founders
American corporate directors
Philanthropists from New York (state)
Female billionaires
Columbian College of Arts and Sciences alumni
Jewish American philanthropists
Businesspeople from New York City
Steve Wynn